Loanne Bishop (born November 10, 1955) is an American actress, of film and television.

Bishop was raised in Denver, Colorado. Her father was a Mennonite minister and her mother was a teacher. She first attended Denver University, where she was a theatre major, then transferred to the University of Colorado, where she was a German major.

Career 

Loanne Bishop moved to Los Angeles in 1978; she worked as a singing waitress for several months. She was the lead in the independently-produced film The Wisdom Barrier.

Bishop appeared on Kate Loves a Mystery and Barnaby Jones. Bishop played the character of Rose Kelly in the TV daytime soap opera General Hospital from 1980 until 1984. In 1984, she was nominated for the Daytime Emmy Award as Outstanding Supporting Actress in a Drama Series. During her time on General Hospital, she made appearances at various events. Bishop, a mezzo soprano who can pay the violin, performed on the album Love in the Afternoon with other soap opera stars. She did not want to sign a long-term contract for the show.

In 1985, Bishop was in Hostage Flight, she played a flight attendant.

She appeared on Hill Street Blues in 1987.

Personal life 
She dated Peter Bergman in the 1980s.

Filmography 
   Rizzoli & Isles as Mona Evans (1 episode 2015)
 The Call (2013)(TV movie) as Lorraine Parker
 Mad Men (TV series) as Barb (1 episode, 2013)
 101 Ways to Get Rejected (TV series) as McKenzie's Mom (1 episode, 2013)
 Don Jon (2013) as Barbara's Mom
Days of Our Lives (TV series) as Mrs. Carlisle (1 episode, 2012)
The Closer (TV series) as Mrs. Gates (1 episode, 2011)
Body of Proof (TV series) as Liz Green (2 episodes, 2011)
Better with You (TV series) as Elaine Dickinson (3 episodes, 2011)
Big Love (TV series) as Nurse (1 episode, 2011)
Glee (TV series) as Waitress (1 episode, 2010)
Without a Trace (TV series) as Mrs. Feretti (1 episode, 2009)
Close to Home (TV series) as Melinda Joffe (1 episode, 2006)
Justice (TV series) as Mrs. Diggs (1 episode, 2006)
Monk (TV series) as Alumni Chairwoman (1 episode, 2006)
In Justice (TV series) as Rita Stillwell (1 episode, 2006)
Cold Case (TV series) as Mrs. Atwater (1 episode, 2004)
Spectres (2004) as Suzanne
Malcolm in the Middle (TV series) as Woman (1 episode, 2003)
Threat Matrix (TV series) as Doctor (1 episode, 2003)
The District (TV series) as Commander Sarah Ochoa (2 episodes, 2003)
The Practice (TV series) as Christina Wayne (1 episode, 2003)
Dragnet (TV series) as Brenda Hollister (1 episode, 2003)
MDs (TV series) as Soccer Mom (1 episode, 2002)
Alabama Dreams (TV series) as Tilly Sims (1 episode, 2001)
Buffy the Vampire Slayer (TV series) as 911 Operator (voice) (1 episode, 2001)
Family Law (TV series) as Female Wildlife Warden (1 episode, 2000)
7th Heaven (TV series) as Sharon (1 episode, 2000)
Kiss the Girls (1997) as Kate's Nurse
Three Wishes (1995) as Bystander
Step by Step (TV series) as Becky Ann Covington (1 episode, 1995)
The Middle Passage (1994)
Kalifornia (1993) as Female Officer
The Wonder Years (TV series) as Class President (1 episode, 1993)
Baby of the Bride (1991)(TV movie) as Nurse (uncredited)
False Arrest (1991) (TV movie) as Nurse #2
Hooperman (TV series) as Frankie Childs (1 episode, 1989)
Santa Barbara (TV series) as Rita Grant (18 episodes, 1987–1988)
Hill Street Blues (TV series) as Billie Jo (1 episode, 1987)
Hill Street Blues (TV series) as Mrs. Metcalf (1 episode, 1987)
Hostage Flight (1985) (TV movie) as Colette
General Hospital (TV series) as Rose Kelly (unknown episodes, 1980–1984)
Barnaby Jones (TV series) as Laurie (1 episode, 1980)
Mrs. Columbo (TV series) as Young Woman (1 episode, 1979)

References

External links

Full-page photo in The Vancouver Sun feature

1955 births
20th-century American actresses
21st-century American actresses
American television actresses
Living people
Actresses from Colorado